In mathematics and especially game theory, the airport problem is a type of fair division problem in which it is decided how to distribute the cost of an airport runway among different players who need runways of different lengths.  The problem was introduced by S. C. Littlechild and G. Owen in 1973. Their proposed solution is:

 Divide the cost of providing the minimum level of required facility for the smallest type of aircraft equally among the number of landings of all aircraft
 Divide the incremental cost of providing the minimum level of required facility for the second smallest type of aircraft (above the cost of the smallest type) equally among the number of landings of all but the smallest type of aircraft.  Continue thus until finally the incremental cost of the largest type of aircraft is divided equally among the number of landings made by the largest aircraft type.

The authors note that the resulting set of landing charges is the Shapley value for an appropriately defined game.

Introduction 
In an airport problem there is a finite population N and a nonnegative function C: N-R. For technical reasons it is assumed that the population is taken from the set of the natural numbers: players are identified with their 'ranking number'. The cost function satisfies the inequality C(i) <C（j）whenever i <j. It is typical for airport problems that the cost C（i）is assumed to be a part of the cost C(j) if i<j, i.e. a coalition S is confronted with costs c(S): =MAX C(i). In this way an airport problem generates an airport game (N,c). As the value of each one-person coalition (i) equals C(i), we can rediscover the airport problem from the airport game theory.

Nash Equilibrium 
Nash equilibrium, also known as non-cooperative game equilibrium, is an essential term in game theory described by John Nash in 1951. In a game process, regardless of the opponent's strategy choice, one of the parties will choose a certain strategy, which is called dominant strategy. If any participant chooses the optimal strategy when the strategies of all other participants are determined, then this combination is defined as a Nash equilibrium. A game may include multiple Nash equilibrium or none. In addition, a combination of strategies is called the Nash balance. when each player's balance strategy is to achieve the maximum value of its expected return, at the same time, all other players also follow this strategy. There is a video of Nash equilibrium.

Shapley value 
The Shapley value is a solution concept used in game theory. There is a video of Shapley value. The Shapley value is mainly applicable to the following situation: the contribution of each actor is not equal, but each participant cooperates with each other to obtain profit or return. The efficiency of the resource allocation and combination of the two distribution methods are more reasonable and fair, and it also reflects the process of mutual game among the league members. However, the benefit distribution plan of the Shapley value method has not considered the risk sharing factors of organization members, which essentially implies the assumption of equal risk sharing. It is necessary to make appropriate amendments to the benefit distribution plan of Shapley value method according to the size of risk sharing.

Example 
An airport needs to build a runway for 4 different aircraft types. The building cost associated with each aircraft is 8, 11, 13, 18 for aircraft A, B, C, D. We would come up with the following cost table based on Shapley value:

See also 
Introduction video of confrontation analysis.

List of games in game theory.

References 

Fair division
Cooperative games